Platensina is a genus of tephritid or fruit flies in the family Tephritidae.

Species
Platensina acrostacta (Wiedemann, 1824)
Platensina alboapicalis Hering, 1938
Platensina amita Hardy, 1974
Platensina ampla Meijere, 1914
Platensina amplipennis (Walker, 1860)
Platensina apicalis Hendel, 1915
Platensina aptata Hardy, 1974
Platensina bezzii Hardy, 1974
Platensina diaphasis (Bigot, 1891)
Platensina euryptera (Bezzi, 1913)
Platensina flavistigma David & Hancock, 2022
Platensina fukienica Hering, 1939
Platensina fulvifacies Hering, 1941
Platensina guttatolimbata (Enderlein, 1911)
Platensina intacta Hardy, 1973
Platensina katangana Munro, 1937
Platensina nigrodiscalis Munro, 1947
Platensina parvipuncta Malloch, 1939
Platensina quadrula Hardy, 1973
Platensina rabbanii David & Hancock, 2022
Platensina sumbana Enderlein, 1911
Platensina tetrica Hering, 1939
Platensina trimaculata Hardy & Drew, 1996
Platensina voneda (Walker, 1849)
Platensina woodi (Bezzi, 1924)
Platensina zodiacalis (Bezzi, 1913)

References

Tephritinae
Tephritidae genera
Diptera of Asia
Diptera of Africa
Diptera of Australasia